The Asia/Oceania Zone was one of three zones of regional competition in the 2005 Davis Cup.

Group I

Group II

Iran and the Philippines relegated to Group III in 2004.
South Korea promoted to Group I in 2004.

Group III
Venue: Victoria Park Tennis Centre, Causeway Bay, Hong Kong (hard)
Date: 13–17 July

(scores in italics carried over from Groups)

Hong Kong and Malaysia promoted to Group II in 2006.
Qatar and Tajikistan relegated to Group IV in 2006.

Group IV
Venue: Thein Byu Tennis Club, Yangon, Myanmar (hard)
Date: Week of 25 April

Bangladesh and Singapore promoted to Group III in 2006.

See also
Davis Cup structure

 
Asia
Davis Cup Asia/Oceania Zone